The Air Force Reserve Command, known officially as the AIR RESCOM or RESCOM, is one of the Philippine Air Force's Major Support Commands created for the sole purpose of Reserve Force management, procurement, and organization.

Lineage of commanding officers
  COL Rodolfo C Abad PAF (GSC) 
  COL Ferdinand B Donesa PAF (GSC) 
  COL Josefino B Gabor PAF (GSC) 
  COL Domingo A Rodriguez PAF (GSC) 
  COL Pablo C Doble PAF (GSC) 
 BGEN  Rogelio T Estacio (GSC) AFP
  COL Ramon C Fabie PAF (GSC) 
  COL Elias M Sta Clara PAF (GSC) 
  COL Rolando Y Espejo PAF (GSC) 
  BGEN Antonio V Rustia AFP
  COL Virgilio E Calip PAF (GSC) 
  COL Jose C Bautista JR PAF (GSC) 
  BGEN Jose V Balajadia JR AFP
  BGEN Adelberto F Yap AFP
  BGEN Nilo C Jatico AFP
  COL Roberto L Ricalde PAF (GSC) 
  BGEN Orlando B Yabut AFP
  BGEN Reulucio G Samaco AFP
  BGEN Lino Horacio E Lapinid AFP
 BGEN ALEJANDRO T CAMAGAY AFP
 BGEN DANILO M FERRER AFP
 BGEN RAMIRO BUSALANAN AFP
 BGEN WILLIAM P TURALDE AFP
 BGEN RAYMUND Dv ELEFANTE AFP
 BGEN ENRICO L IGNACIO AFP
 BGEN EERNESTO C MILO AFP
 BGEN FRANCISCO V CARADA AFP
 BGEN ROLANDO S ACOP AFP
 LTGEN CONNOR ANTHONY D CANLAS SR PAF
 MGEN ARTHUR M CORDURA PAF
 MGEN EDWARD L LIBAGO PAF (GSC)
 COL LEODIGARIO V MACALINTAL PAF (MNSA) (Acting Commander)

Units

Line units
 1st Air Reserve Center (1ARCEN) - Villamor Air Base, Pasay
 2nd Air Reserve Center (2ARCEN) - Clark Air Base, Angeles City, Pampanga
 3rd Air Reserve Center (3ARCEN) - Fernando Air Base, Lipa City, Batangas
 4th Air Reserve Center (4ARCEN) - Antonio Bautista Air Base, Puerto Princesa City, Palawan
 5th Air Reserve Center (5ARCEN) - Mactan Air base, Lapu-Lapu City
 6th Air Reserve Center (6ARCEN) - Edwin Andrews Air Base, Santa Maria, Zamboanga city
 7th Air Reserve Center (7ARCEN) - TOWEASTMIN, Davao Air Station, Old Airport, Sasa, Davao City
 8th Air Reserve Center (8ARCEN) - TOG 10, Lumbia, Cagayan de Oro City

Reserve Air Wings
1st Air Force Wing (Reserve) - Villamor Air Base, Pasay - Wing Commander : BGEN RAYMUNDO T FRANCSICO PAFR
  2nd Air Force Wing (Reserve) - Clark Air Base, Mabalacat City, Pampanga - OIC Wing : LTC PAUL G FUDOTAN PAFR (GSC)
 Awards: AIR FORCE WING RESERVE OF THE YEAR 2020
 3rd Air Force Wing (Reserve) - Basilio Fernando Air Base, Lipa City, Batangas
 4th Air Force Wing (Reserve) - Antonio Bautista Air Base, Puerto Princesa City, Palawan
 5th Air Force Wing (Reserve) - Mactan Air base, Lapu-Lapu City
 6th Air Force Wing (Reserve) - Edwin Andrews Air Base, Santa Maria, Zamboanga city
 7th Air Force Wing (Reserve) - HQs 7th ARCen, TOWEASTMIN, Davao Air Station, Old Airport, Sasa, Davao City

Reserve Air Groups
11th Air Force Group Reserve  - Villamor Air Base, Pasay - Group Commander : LTC ELMER A NICOLAS PAFR(GSC) (2020 up to present)
Group Awards: OJ9 AFP Ready Reserve Unit of the Year 2016(Battalion/Group) Category
Units under 11th Air Force Group Reserve:
 1101st Advance Command Post (Malabon City).
 1102nd Advance Command Post (Navotas City).
 1103rd Advance Command Post(Caloocan City).
 1104th Advance Command Post (Valenzuela City).
 1121st Advance Command Post( Greater Lagro).
 1122nd Advance Command Post (QC City Hall).
 1131st Advance Command Post( Marikina City).
 12th Air Force Group Reserve  - Villamor Air Base, Pasay - Group Commander : LTC JUDE E ESTRADA PAFR(GSC)
 13th Air Force Group Reserve  - Villamor Air Base, Pasay - Group Commander : Lt. Col Gervacio T. Alvero PAF(GSC) - Group Awards : Best Group of the year (2015-2016)
21st Air Force Group Reserve - Baguio Airport, Baguio, Benguet - Group Commander : LTC JOSE ANTONIO LAMBINO PAFR (MNSA)
22nd Air Force Group Reserve - TOG 2, Cauayan, Isabela - Group Commander : LTC ARTHUR P TUGADE PAFR
 23rd Air Force Group Reserve - Cesar Basa Air Base, Floridablanca, Pampanga  - Group Commander : LTC JOSE PAOLO L DELGADO PAFR (MNSA)
Units under 23rd Air Force Group Reserve:
 231st Airlift Squadron Reserve.
 232nd Search and Rescue Squadron Reserve.
 233rd Motor Vehicle Squadron Reserve.
 234th Civil Engineering Squadron Reserve.
 235th Air Police Squadron Reserve.
 236th Aeromedical Squadron Reserve.

Affiliate reserve units
 1st Airlift Wing Reserve - Philippines AirAsia Inc.
 500th (RESCUE 5) Search and Rescue Group (Reserve)
 123rd PAFARU RG Meditron, Inc.
 124th PAFARU (EAGLECOM) Ready Reserve
 128th Fire Crash and Rescue Group (READY RESERVE) (Association of Volunteer Fire Chiefs and Firefighters of the Philippines Inc.)
 Masters Flying School 
1110th Air Reconnaissance Reserve Squadron (AISAT-DAVAO)

Awards and decorations

Campaign streamers

Badges

See also 
Cadet rank in the Philippines

See also
Armed Forces of the Philippines Reserve Command
Philippine Army Reserve Command
Philippine Navy Reserve Command
Philippine Coast Guard Auxiliary

References

Bibliography

Official Site AIR RESCOM
Air Science 21 AFROTC Manual, 2001, AIR RESCOM
https://web.archive.org/web/20160322150549/http://www.philippinefirefighter.org/main.php

Military units and formations of the Philippine Air Force